Canterbury is an electoral district of the Legislative Assembly in the Australian state of New South Wales, currently represented by Sophie Cotsis of the Labor Party.

Canterbury includes the suburbs of Campsie, Canterbury, Clemton Park, Earlwood, Hurlstone Park, Undercliffe and parts of Ashbury, Belfield, Belmore, Beverly Hills, Kingsgrove and Roselands.

History
Canterbury was created in 1859, replacing part of Cumberland (South Riding), named after and including the then town, now Sydney suburb, of Canterbury.  It was bordered on the east by Glebe and Newtown, and from 1880, Balmain and Redfern and stretched in the north to Drummoyne and Rhodes, south to Georges River and west to a line between Salt Pan Creek and Homebush Bay.  It was a multi-member electorate, electing two members until 1882 and then four members until the abolition of multi-member electorates in 1894, when it was split into Canterbury, Ashfield, Burwood, Petersham and St George.  It was abolished in 1920, with the introduction of proportional representation and absorbed into St George.  It was recreated in 1927, and has been held by Labor for all but one term since. In recent decades it has become one of Labor's safest seats.

Members for Canterbury

Election results

References

Canterbury
1859 establishments in Australia
Canterbury
1920 disestablishments in Australia
Canterbury
1927 establishments in Australia
Canterbury